The 1944 United States presidential election in Kentucky took place on November 7, 1944, as part of the 1944 United States presidential election. Kentucky voters chose 11 representatives, or electors, to the Electoral College, who voted for president and vice president.

Kentucky was won by incumbent President Franklin D. Roosevelt (D–New York), running with Senator Harry S. Truman, with 54.45 percent of the popular vote, against Governor Thomas E. Dewey (R–New York), running with Governor John W. Bricker, with 45.22 percent of the popular vote.

Results

Results by county

References

Kentucky
1944
1944 Kentucky elections